Horsepen Mountain is a mountain of the Appalachian Plateau on the border of Logan and Mingo Counties, West Virginia, United States. It is the highest point in Mingo County.  The Mingo Lookout Tower is located on the mountain.

References

Mountains of West Virginia
Landforms of Logan County, West Virginia
Landforms of Mingo County, West Virginia